Cottonwood Branch or Cottonwood Creek is a stream in Henry County in the U.S. state of Missouri. It is a tributary of Honey Creek.

Cottonwood Branch was so named due to the presence of cottonwood timber along its banks.

See also
List of rivers of Missouri

References

Rivers of Henry County, Missouri
Rivers of Missouri